Johnny Chapman (born December 14, 1967) is an American stock car racing driver.

Racing career
Chapman has won 40 races in NASCAR's Late Model Stock Division as well as being a two-time Goody's Dash Series Champion on his way up the rankings in the late 1980s and early 1990s. In 1997, after running a few one-off races he signed a contract to run the No. 89 Sherwin-Williams Ford in the NASCAR Busch Series. He had three top fifteen finishes that year, including his best major NASCAR finish of 11th in the Winston Motorsports 300 on June 13. His career died down for a while as he ran a handful of races in the next few years in the NASCAR Nationwide Series and NASCAR Camping World Truck Series. Chapman has run one NASCAR Sprint Cup race, which came in 1993 in the No. 64 Bahre Racing Pontiac. He finished 36th. In 2008 and 2009, he drove full-time in the No. 90 Chevrolet for MSRP Motorsports,  a start and park team in the Nationwide Series.  He also started and parked for Gunbroker Racing, Wyler Racing, and SS-Green Light Racing in select Camping World Truck Series races. For 2010, Chapman has been tabbed by K-Automotive Motorsports to drive their No. 92 Dodge in the Nationwide Series. Along with Dennis Setzer in the No. 96, he started and parked to help fund the No. 26 of Brian Keselowski. After briefly driving Morgan Shepherd's No. 89 Chevrolet in 2010, he raced for Fleur-de-lis Motorsports at Texas. In 2011 he drove a Nationwide car for Rick Ware Racing as a start and park operation to support Ware's other Nationwide cars. He also drove a few races for SS-Green Light Racing in the No. 07 truck. Chapman primarily made his living as a start-and-park driver for underfunded and unsponsored teams and last ran a NASCAR-sanctioned race in 2013.

Personal life
Chapman is married and has two children.

Motorsports career results

NASCAR
(key) (Bold – Pole position awarded by qualifying time. Italics – Pole position earned by points standings or practice time. * – Most laps led.)

Winston Cup Series

Nationwide Series

Camping World Truck Series

 Ineligible for series points

ARCA Re/Max Series
(key) (Bold – Pole position awarded by qualifying time. Italics – Pole position earned by points standings or practice time. * – Most laps led.)

References

External links
 
 Driver Profile
 Yahoo Driver Page

Living people
1967 births
People from Statesville, North Carolina
Racing drivers from North Carolina
NASCAR drivers
ISCARS Dash Touring Series drivers
Michael Waltrip Racing drivers